Richard Tarrant may refer to:

 R. J. Tarrant, American classicist
 Richard Tarrant (politician) (born 1942), American politician and businessman
 Richard "Dick" Tarrant (born 1930), American basketball coach